Nymphoides crenata, commonly known as wavy marshwort, is an aquatic perennial herb of the family Menyanthaceae endemic to Australia, found in all mainland states and the Northern Territory

Description 
It is a stoloniferous, floating, perennial with stems up to 3 m long. The petioles of the basal leaves are from 8–42 cm long. The leaf lamina are ovate to circular, and deeply cordate and vary from 3 to 15 cm in length. The stem leaves are smaller, and sometimes kidney-shaped. The flowers heterostylous, (see the gallery) and there can be from 8 to14 in clusters subtended by 1–4 stem leaves, or sometimes in spaced pairs along a short inflorescence. The calyx  is from 5.5 to 16 mm long and the corolla from 20 to 50 mm in diameter. There are usually 4 lobes (sometimes 4 or 6) and there are usually 5 stigmas (but from 2-5).

Habitat 
It grows on floodplains, in swamps, lagoons, irrigation channels, and also in temporarily inundated depressions, and in slow-flowing streams where the depth of the water is up to about 1.5 m deep, usually on mud, and it will persist on drying mud.

Taxonomy
Nymphoides crenata was first described as Limnanthemum crenatum in 1854 by Ferdinand von Mueller. In 1891, Otto Kuntze transferred it to the genus, Nymphoides.

Gallery

References

crenata
Freshwater plants
Flora of New South Wales
Plants described in 1854
Taxa named by Ferdinand von Mueller
Flora of Victoria (Australia)
Flora of Queensland
Flora of South Australia
Flora of the Northern Territory
Flora of Western Australia